Petr Šálek, MFA, QEP (born 1948 in Prague, Czechoslovakia) is a Czech photographer. He is mostly known for work in commercial and fashion photography, but also produces work as an experimental photographer. He does panoramic photography and high pigment quality printing. Wide-angle photography, composition, lighting and geometric landscape are Šálek's signature features. 

Šálek studied at the Film and TV School of the Academy of Performing Arts in Prague, in the Department of Art Photography. He left Czechoslovakia in 1981, during the normalization period, returning after the Velvet Revolution. His work has been published in several photo books and magazines and exhibited in several prominent venues. He was awarded the 2002 title of Qualified European Photographer in the category of Advertising Photography in Orvieto on 16 March 2002.

Select solo exhibitions 
 1996 Young Fashion - Künstlerfest, Erlangen, FRG
 1996 Water Folly – Blumen & Art, Nuremberg, FRG
 1996 Avantgarde – Ward-Nasse Gallery, New York, USA
 1996 Flowers – Blumen & Art, Nuremberg, FRG
 1997 Technikum – Schwan Stabilo, Heroldsberg, FRG
 1997 Digital Photographs – Motor-Presse-Verlag, Stuttgart, FRG
 1997 Photographs – Funkhaus, Nuremberg, FRG
 1998 Photographs – Cebit, Hanover, FRG
 1998 Views – picture gallery OBI, Nuremberg, FRG
 1998 World of Photography – representation of Epson company, Vienna, Austria
 1999 Enwrap (photographs in collaboration with the German choreographer Felix Ruckert) – club Solidní nejistota, Prague
 2000 Prague – European City of Culture – exhibition accompanying the performances of the company Dance Perfekt in partner 
 2000 European cities of culture - Brussels, Bologna, Reykjavik, Avignon, Helsinki
 2000 Jak se kalí grafie (How Calli Graphs, collaboration with Petr Geisler) - National Gallery in Prague, Zbraslav Chateau
 2001 Animal Dancing – Studio Fénix, Prague
 2002 Photo Calligraphy (combination of photographs with calligraphy by Petr Geisler) club Solidní nejistota, Prague
 2002 Blind Alley – Studio Fénix, Prague
 2002 Qualified European Photographer – National Museum of Photography, Jindřichův Hradec
 2003 Crooks 1 – International Exhibition Interkamera, Prague Exhibition Grounds
 2004 Photo Calligraphy 2 – Mironet Company, Prague
 2004 Crooks 2 – club Solidní nejistota, Prague
 2004 Photo Calligraphy 3 – Digiforum, Prague
 2004 Crooks 3 – Allegro Gallery, Prague
 2005 Mud on Canvas – International Exhibition Interkamera, Prague Exhibition Grounds
 2006 Prague XXL – Old Town City Hall of Prague
 2008 Prague Panoramic – Buenos Aires
 2008 Praguefoto - Prague
 2009 Airport Praha-Ruzyně, City of Prague, Presentation on Occasion of the EU-Chairmanship of Czech Republic (Co-Author Graphic Designer Pavel Dufek)
 2009 Foto Calligraphy - Cafe Kino Lucerna, Prague
 2009 Water Games - Famood, Prague
 2010 1984 - (Variations on George Orwell´s book), Hotel Clarion, Prague
 2011 1984-2 - Cafe Technika, Prague
 2011 Prague Panoramic - Hotel Leonardo, Prague
 2011 1984-3 - DOX, Prague
 2012 Prague Panoramic - New Town Hall, Prague
 2012 Railway Bridge - Cafe Kofein, Prague, in cooperation with Pavel Dufek
 2012 Railway Bridge 2 - Winehouse Voršilka, Prague, in cooperation with Pavel Dufek
 2014 Photo Calligraphy (combination of photographs with calligraphy by Petr Geisler) - Prostor, Prague
 2015 Where is my home, where is my home? - Prostor, Prague, in cooperation with Pavel Dufek
 2015 1984,The National Library, Pristina, Kosovo
 2016 Prague Panoramic, The National Library, Pristina, Kosovo
 2017 Prague Panoramic, Permanent Mission of the Czech Republic to the United Nations, New York
 2018 Praha  Panoramic, Kabul, Embassy of the Czech Republic
 2022 Where is my home?, Roesel - beer & food, Prague,in cooperation with Pavel Dufek
 2022 Where is my home II?, Hostel Brix, Prague,in cooperation with Pavel Dufek

Included in collections 
 National Museum of Photography, Jindřichův Hradec 
 Gold Collection of gifts from contemporary Czech photographers
 National Library of the Czech Republic
 Museum of Decorative Arts in Prague

Books 
 Československá fotografie v exilu (1939–1989), Prague, 1992, Anna Fárová, Catalogue 
 Die neue Akt Fotoschule, 2000, VERLAG PHOTOGRAPHIE, 
 Reklama 1990–1999, 2000, Asociace fotografů, 
 Asociace fotografů České republiky se představuje: Petr Šálek, FotoVideo 2001, č. 11
 Česká fotografie 20. století, Prague, 2005, Vladimír Birgus, Jan Mlčoch, UPM, KANT,  
 1984, Prague  : Petr Šálek, 2011, Graphic Design by Pavel Dufek, 
 Praha XXL = Prague XXL ; Tělo = Body, Catalogue of the Exhibition at the Old Town Hall, Prague: Petr Šálek, 2005, 
 Jeden den České republiky, (One day in the life of Czech Republic) Editor: Pavel Radosta, 2007, str. 156, 157
 ''PRAGUE, Petr Šálek, 2016, Graphic Design by Pavel Dufek,

References

External links 

 Official website
  www.PetrSalek.com

Photographers from Prague
1948 births
Living people